Joseph LeRoux M.D.  (9 April 1849 – 1904) was an early Canadian numismatist, who published several significant works on pre-Canadian Confederation coins, tokens and medals in the 1880s. Along with other early Canadian numismatists like Alfred Sandham, R. W. McLachlan, and P. N. Breton, he helped lay the foundations of Canadian numismatic research.

LeRoux published the following books on Canadian numismatics:
 Numismatic Atlas for Canada, (Fr. Atlas numismatique du Canada), published in 1883
 Vade mecum du collectionneur, published in 1885
 The Canadian Coin Cabinet, (Fr. Le médaillier du Canada) published in 1888, with a subsequent publication in 1890

Notes

External links
 Vade mecum du collectionneur on Archive.org
 The Canadian Coin Cabinet on Archive.org
 Numismatic Atlas for Canada on Archive.org

Bibliography

Canadian numismatists
1849 births
1904 deaths